The Zwölferkofel or Zwölfer (German for "Twelve" or "Twelfth") is a peak of the Sexten Dolomites on the border between the provinces of South Tyrol and Belluno, in Italy.

References 
 Alpenverein South Tyrol

External links 

Mountains of the Alps
Mountains of South Tyrol
Alpine three-thousanders
Dolomites
Sexten Dolomites